Cristóbal Orellana Sierra is a Mexican actor and singer, born on July 11, 1983 in Mexico City.

Biography 
He started his musical career in Guadalajara, Jalisco, as a member of the boyband Genoma VERSUS and recorded an album named Contra el Suelo. Later joined the Disney's reality show: High School Musical: La Selección (México) where they would record together with his fellow two albums with songs performed in the program, Cristobal would win that competition by obtaining the starring role of the first movie from Disney Latinoamerica called: High School Musical: El Desafio Mexico that premiered in September 2008. This film is ranked as the third highest grossing in the premiere and the soundtrack of it sold over 50,000 copies earning a gold record.

In late 2008 and early 2009 Cristobal conduct a successful tour around the Mexican Republic by the name of High School Musical: El Desafio en Gira with the most popular repertoire of songs of the film as El Verano Termino, Siempre Juntos and Yo Sabia.

Today Cristobal Orellana is part of the family, Disney Latinoamerica in Mexico.

Trajectory

Film 
Disney High School Musical: El Desafio Mexico. (Walt Disney Pictures / 2008) Starring role.

TV 
 Protagonist of TV Azteca's 2015 musical soap, UEPA, Un escenario para Amar Netflix
 Special appearance in TV Azteca's 2012 series A Corazón Abierto
 Lo que callamos las mujeres, A cada quien su santo (TV Azteca)

Host, performance and musical interpretation 
 Reality show winner Disney High School Musical: La Selección (México). (Disney / TV Azteca)
 Zapping Zone (Disney Channel Latin America)
 Planeta Disney, Póker de Reinas, Venga la alegría, Disney Club, Para Todos (TV Azteca)
 Reality show contender at "Soy tu Doble" TV Show (TV Azteca)

Discography 
 Disney High School Musical: El Desafio Mexico Soundtrack. ( Sony Music / 2008) Gold record.
 Disney High School Musical: La Selección (México) Vol. 1 and 2. ( Sony Music / 2007)
 Genoma VERSUS, Contra el Suelo. (Three Sound Records / 2003)

References

External links 
Official Website

1983 births
Living people
Mexican male film actors
Mexican male television actors
Male actors from Mexico City
People from Guadalajara, Jalisco
Singers from Mexico City
21st-century Mexican singers
21st-century Mexican male singers